The Ognon is a river of Eastern France. It is a left tributary of the Saône, which it joins in Pontailler-sur-Saône. Its source is in Haut-du-Them-Château-Lambert in the Vosges Mountains near the Ballon d'Alsace.

The Ognon flows through the following departments and towns: Haute-Saône, with Mélisey, Lure, Villersexel, Pesmes; Doubs, with Rougemont; Jura; Côte-d'Or, with Pontailler-sur-Saône.

Tributaries
Some of its tributaries include:
The Rahin
The Scey
The Reigne
The Buthiers

References

External links
Website of an association of owners of historical sites in the Ognon valley (french - english)

Rivers of France
Rivers of Côte-d'Or
Rivers of Doubs
Rivers of Haute-Saône
Rivers of Jura (department)
Rivers of Bourgogne-Franche-Comté